Xanthorhoe lacustrata, the toothed brown carpet moth, is a species of geometrid moth in the family Geometridae. It is found in North America.

The MONA or Hodges number for Xanthorhoe lacustrata is 7390.

References

Further reading

External links

 

Xanthorhoe
Articles created by Qbugbot
Moths described in 1858